Boyle Park is an approximately 250 acre urban park located in west-central Little Rock. The land for Boyle Park was donated to the City of Little Rock in 1929 by Dr. John F. Boyle. It was added to the National Register of Historic Places in 1995 for the eight known intact examples of Civilian Conservation Corps rustic architecture.
The park is mostly unimproved woodland. However, the park contains a small wildlife pond, two playgrounds, three pavilions, one gazebo, open meadows, woods, and numerous hiking and biking trails. Rock Creek flows through the park.

References

Urban public parks
Geography of Little Rock, Arkansas
Civilian Conservation Corps in Arkansas
Protected areas of Pulaski County, Arkansas
Tourist attractions in Little Rock, Arkansas